Macksey is a surname. Notable people with the surname include:

Kenneth Macksey (1923–2005), British historian and military writer
Richard Macksey (1931–2019), American academic